The  is a concept car introduced by Mazda and partner Ford at the 2007 North American International Auto Show in Detroit, Michigan. The car, along with the Mazda Nagare which was introduced at the Greater Los Angeles Auto Show, is an exploratory design study intended to illustrate future styling directions for future Mazda passenger vehicles. The Ryuga moniker (pronounced "ree-yoo-ga") is Japanese for "gracious flow".

Exterior
The large 21" wheels are placed at the far corners for a stable, balanced stance.  The body features two gull-wing doors, and is significantly shorter and lower than the four-passenger Mazda RX-8 sports car.

Interior

The Ryuga accommodates four passengers in typical 2+2 seating, with front bucket seats and a lounge-like rear passenger area.  A "floating" center cluster with elongated pods includes a multi-function touch panel for controls and displays. A set of charge-coupled device (CCD) cameras are installed for monitoring the rearward view and blind-spot.  The steering wheel is an open top style, which utilizes steer-by-wire technology.

Performance
The Ryuga is powered with an E85 / gasoline flex fuel engine.

Specifications
Engine:  MZR 2.5 L E85/gasoline Flex Fuel
Transmission:  6 -speed automatic
Drive:  front-wheel drive
Wheels:  21"
Tires (Front/Rear) 245/35 R21 (93W) Toyo Proxes

External links
Mazda Ryuga introduction from Media.Ford.com *Dead Link
Mazda Ryuga details and specifications from Media.Ford.com *Dead Link

Ryuga
Automobiles with gull-wing doors
Front-wheel-drive vehicles